98 (ninety-eight) is the natural number following 97 and preceding 99.

In mathematics
98 is: 
 Wedderburn–Etherington number
 nontotient
 number of non-isomorphic set-systems of weight 7

In astronomy
 Messier 98, a magnitude 11.0 spiral galaxy in the constellation Coma Berenices.
 The New General Catalogue object NGC 98, a magnitude 12.7 spiral galaxy in the constellation Phoenix.

In computing
Windows 98, a Microsoft operating system for personal computers
Microsoft Flight Simulator 98, a flight simulator program

In space travel
MPTA-098, the Main Propulsion Test Article built as a systems testbed for the Space Shuttle program
Pathfinder (OV-098), a Space Shuttle simulator built by NASA in 1977
STS-98, Space Shuttle Atlantis mission launched February 7, 2001

In other fields 
 
Ninety-eight is:

The atomic number of californium, an actinide
+98, the code for international direct dial phone calls to Iran
98 Degrees, an American adult contemporary boy band
98.6 degrees Fahrenheit is normal body temperature
"98.6", a 1967 hit song by Keith
10-98 code in police code means "Assignment Completed"
The number of sons of Ater in the census of men of Israel upon return from exile (Bible, Ezra 2:16)
Beach 98th Street, often referred as Beach 98th Street–Playland, a station on the New York City Subway's IND Rockaway Line
Expo '98, a World's Fair held in Lisbon, Portugal, from May to September 1998
Oldsmobile 98, a full-size automobile and the highest-end of the Oldsmobile division of General Motors
Power 98 (radio station), an English radio station of So Drama! Entertainment in Singapore
Power 98 (film), a 1996 film starring Eric Roberts about a Los Angeles talk radio station.
"Power 98", official nickname of radio station WPEG, in Charlotte, North Carolina
Saab 98, a project by automaker Saab for a combi coupé based on the Saab 95
Spirit of '98, a ship owned by Cruise West built to accommodate 98 passengers
The Trail of '98, a 1928 western film

In sports
The highest jersey number allowed in the National Hockey League, as 99 was retired by the entire league to honor Wayne Gretzky and major-league sports only allow one- or two-digit uniform numbers.

See also
List of highways numbered 98

References 

Integers